

The Militi M.B.2 Leonardo is an Italian single-seat powered flying-boat glider designed and built by Bruno Militi.

Design and development
A powered version of Militi's M.B.1 flying-boat glider the Leonardo is a parasol-wing monoplane with a two-step hull and a fuselage of aluminium alloy, wood and fibreglass. The mixed construction wing is supported by two N-form cabane struts in the centre and a V-strut outboard on each side; it has plain ailerons but no flaps.  The pilot has an open cockpit with a small windscreen.  The  modified Panhard motor car engine is strut-mounted above the wing centre section and drives a two-bladed fixed-pitch laminated wood pusher propeller. The aircraft was first flown on 21 June 1970 and was exhibited at the 1972 Turin Air Show.

Specifications

See also

References

Notes

Bibliography

1970s Italian civil utility aircraft
Homebuilt aircraft
Flying boats
Single-engined pusher aircraft
MB02
Glider aircraft
Parasol-wing aircraft
Aircraft first flown in 1970